General Superintendent is the highest elected office within the Church of the Nazarene. General Superintendents are elected by the General Assembly of the denomination for a four-year term to expire at the end of the next General Assembly.

List of General Superintendents

References

 
Nazarene
Naz